Louis Maurer (21 February 1904 – 1 May 1988) was a Swiss football player and manager. He played as a goalkeeper.

Maurer coached FC Blue Stars Zürich, Lausanne Sports, FC Fribourg, Marseille, R. Union Sportive Tournaisienne, FC Zürich, FC Lugano, AC Bellinzona and Switzerland. In his coaching career, he won two national championship titles and three Swiss Cups.

References

External links
Profile on om1899.com (in French)

1904 births
1988 deaths
Swiss men's footballers
FC Lausanne-Sport players
Association football goalkeepers
Swiss football managers
Swiss expatriate football managers
FC Lausanne-Sport managers
Olympique de Marseille managers
FC Zürich managers
AC Bellinzona managers
FC Lugano managers
People from Vevey
Swiss expatriate sportspeople in France
Expatriate football managers in France
Sportspeople from the canton of Vaud